Schinia miniana, the desert-marigold moth, is a moth of the family Noctuidae. The species was first described by Augustus Radcliffe Grote in 1881. It is found in North America from California to western Texas, north to Colorado and Nevada, south into Mexico.

The wingspan is 19–24 mm.

The larvae feed on Baileya.

External links
Species info
BugGuide

Schinia
Moths of North America
Moths described in 1881

Taxa named by Augustus Radcliffe Grote